Ty Burhoe is an American tabla player and live concert producer. He is known primarily in Classical Indian and fusion settings. 

Burhoe has studied with Ustad Zakir Hussain since 1990. Since 1995, Burhoe has served as Zakir Hussain's tour assistant as well as the designer for his custom drums and drum racks which Zakir uses for his tours with Shakti, Masters of Percussion, Mickey Hart & Planet Drum, Charles Lloyd Trio and Lines Ballet collaborations.

Burhoe appears on the soundtracks of the Academy Award-winning documentary Born into Brothels: Calcutta's Red Light Kids (2004).

Discography 
 2001: Breath of the Heart – Krishna Das – Karuna Music
 2002: Shores of Avalon – Tina Malia – Om Town
 2003: Flying Dragon – Gao Hong, Shubhendra Rao, Ty Burhoe, James Newton & Yoshio Kurahashi – Innova
 2004: Speaking the Mamma Tongue – John McDowell – Raven Recording
 2004: Born into Brothels: Calcutta's Red Light Kids – Movie Soundtrack.
 2004: Greatest Hits of the Kali Yuga (CD/DVD set) – Krishna Das – Karuna Music/Triloka Records
 2004: A Drop of the Ocean – Sulthan Khan, Krishna Das (w/ Ty Burhoe, David Nichterm & John McDowell) – Karuna Records/Triloka Records
 2005: All One – Krishna Das – Triloka Records/Artemis Records
 2005: Sky – Bill Douglas, Kai Eckhardt, Steve Smith & Ty Burhoe – Tala Records
 2006: Kirtana – Robert Gass – Spring Hill Music
 2007: Invocation – Ty Burhoe, Krishna Das, Manorama, John Friend & Amy Ippoliti – Tala Records
 2008: Sanctuary – Donna De Lory – Nutone Music
 2008: Heart Full of Soul – Krishna Das – Nutone Music
 2009: Curandero Aras – Miguel Espinoza, Ty Burhoe, Bela Fleck, Kai Eckhardt – Tala Records
2010: Illumination – Ty Burhoe, Steve Gorn & Manose – Tala Records
2012: Samay Chakra - Ty Burhoe, Kala Ramnath - Tala Records
2013: Horizon - Bill Douglas - Tala Records
2017: Sleeping Swan - Ty Burhoe - Tala Records
2018: Peace: Music for Life - Taro Terahara - Tala Records
 2019:  Black Swan - Taro Terahara - Tala Records

References

External links 

1964 births
Living people
20th-century American drummers
20th-century American male musicians
American male drummers
Musicians from Massachusetts
Tabla players
Place of birth missing (living people)